Argentina competed at the 1988 Summer Olympics in Seoul, South Korea. 118 competitors, 93 men and 25 women, took part in 53 events in 18 sports. The country claimed Olympic medals for the first time since 1972.

Medalists

Competitors
The following is the list of number of competitors in the Games.

Archery

Athletics

Boxing

Canoeing

Flatwater
Men

Women

Cycling

Track
Sprints

Pursuits

Points races

Diving

Fencing

Field hockey

Men
Team roster and tournament statistics
Coach: Luis Ciancia

Legend:         

Preliminary Round (Pool A)

 Qualified for semifinals

5th to 8th place classification

7th place match

Women
Team roster and tournament statistics
Coach: Miguel MacCormick

Legend:         

Preliminary round (Pool A)

 Qualified for semifinals

5th to 8th place classification

7th place match

Football

Squad
Matches played in parenthesis denotes player came from the bench

Results
Preliminaries

Quarterfinals

Judo

Key

 Chui – Penalty that equals the loss of five points

Rowing

Sailing

Key
 RET – Retired
 DNC – Did not compete

Shooting

Swimming

Key

DSQ – Disqualified

Table tennis

Tennis

Volleyball

Roster

Coach: Luis Muchaga

Group play

|}

Semifinal

Bronze medal match

 Won Bronze Medal

Wrestling

See also
Argentina at the 1987 Pan American Games

References

Nations at the 1988 Summer Olympics
Olympics
1988